The Wooden Church was a church in Criştelec, Romania, built in 1785 and demolished in 1955.

References

External links
 Fosta Biserică de Lemn

Bibliography 
 Leontin Ghergariu (14 August 1976). „Biserici de lemn din Sălaj”. manuscris în Arhivele Naționale din Zalău, colecția personală Leontin Ghergariu (actul 11 din 1976).

Churches completed in 1785
Buildings and structures demolished in 1955
Greek-Catholic churches in Romania
Wooden churches in Sălaj County